Ajodhyanagar is a census town within the jurisdiction of the Usthi police station in the Magrahat I CD block in the Diamond Harbour subdivision of the South 24 Parganas district in the Indian state of West Bengal.

Geography

Area overview
Diamond Harbour subdivision is a rural subdivision with patches of urbanization. Only 14.61% of the population lives in the urban areas and an overwhelming 85.39% lives the rural areas. In the eastern portion of the subdivision (shown in the map alongside) there are 24 census towns. The entire district is situated in the Ganges Delta and the eastern part of the district is a flat plain area with small towns, many in clusters. Location of places in the larger map varies a little. It is an OpenStreetMap, while we are using coordinates as in Google Maps.

Note: The map alongside presents some of the notable locations in the subdivision. All places marked in the map are linked in the larger full screen map.

Location
Ajodhyanagar is located at 

Hasimnagar,  Baneshwarpur of the Falta CD block and Ajodhyanagar, Sirakol of the Magrahat I CD block form a cluster of census towns.

Demographics
According to the 2011 Census of India, Ajodhyanagar had a total population of 4,409 of which 2,173 (49%) were males and 2,236 (51%) were females. There were 584 persons in the age range of 0–6 years. The total number of literate persons in Ajodhyanagar was 2,691 (70.35% of the population over 6 years).

Infrastructure
According to the District Census Handbook 2011, Ajodhyanagar covered an area of 1.0252 km2. Among the civic amenities, the protected water supply involved overhead tank. It had 353 domestic electric connections. Among the medical facilities it had 3 hospitals, 4 dispensaries/ health centres and 6 medicine shops. Among the educational facilities it had were 1 primary school, 1 middle school, 1 secondary school, 1 senior secondary school.

Transport
Ajodhyanagar is on the National Highway 12.

Healthcare
Baneswarpur Rural Hospital, with 30 beds, at Baneswarpur, is the major government medical facility in the Magrahat I CD block.

References

Cities and towns in South 24 Parganas district